Ross Whyte (born 31 August 1998) is a Scottish curler. He is a two-time European champion and an Olympic silver medallist. He lives in Stirling, Scotland.

Personal life
Whyte is currently studying Sports Studies at the University of Stirling. He also played golf for the South of Scotland U18 team.

Teams

Men's

Mixed

Mixed doubles

Grand Slam record

References

External links

Ross Whyte - Athlete Information - 2016 Winter Youth Olympics profile (web archive)

Team Whyte — The Roaring Game Blog

Living people
1998 births
Sportspeople from York
Curlers from Stirling
Scottish male curlers
European curling champions
Scottish curling champions
Universiade medalists in curling
Universiade bronze medalists for Great Britain
Competitors at the 2019 Winter Universiade
Curlers at the 2016 Winter Youth Olympics
Curlers at the 2022 Winter Olympics
Medalists at the 2022 Winter Olympics
Olympic silver medallists for Great Britain
Olympic medalists in curling
Olympic curlers of Great Britain
Alumni of the University of Stirling
Scottish Olympic medallists